Kaba may refer to:

Places 
 Kaaba, the holiest place in the Islamic World, a large cube-shaped building inside the al-Masjid al-Haram mosque in Mecca
 Kaba, Hungary, a town in Hajdú-Bihar County, Hungary, which had a rare carbonaceous chondrite meteorite fall in 1857
 Kaba, Kyrgyzstan, a village in Jalal-Abad region
 Kaba, Tibet, a village in Nagarze County, Shannan Prefecture
 Kaba Town, northern suburb of Monrovia, Liberia
 Mount Kaba, a volcano in Indonesia about 6 kilometers southeast of the Rejang Lebong Regency in the Bengkulu province
 Kabah (Maya site) (Kaba), a Mayan archaeological site in Mexico

Other 
 Battle of Kaba, a battle in Fiji in 1855
 , an instant cocoa drink
 Kaba Group, a Swiss security technology company
 Kaba language, a Central Sudanic language
 Kaba Modern, a street dance group on MTV's America's Best Dance Crew
 Kaba people, ethnic group of Guinea; see Ange-Félix Patassé
 a cultivar of the tree Karuka
 rats in the Karni Mata Temple, Deshnok, Rajasthan, India
 an OPM song originally by Tenten Muñoz, popularized by Tootsie Guevarra

People with the surname Kaba 
 Alpha Kaba (born 1996), a French basketball player
 Gökhan Kaba, a Turkish footballer
 Mariame Kaba, an American activist and organizer
 Sory Kaba (born 1995), a Guinean professional footballer
 Yağız Kaba, a Turkish basketball player

See also
 KABA (disambiguation)
 Kabah (disambiguation)
 Ka'ba-ye Zartosht, the "cube of Zoroaster", a monument at Naqsh-e Rustam, Iran

Turkish-language surnames